Karoly Grosz (1896–after 1938) was a Hungarian–American illustrator of Classical Hollywood–era film posters. As art director at Universal Pictures for the bulk of the 1930s, Grosz oversaw the company's advertising campaigns and contributed hundreds of his own illustrations. He is especially recognized for his dramatic, colorful posters for classic horror films. Grosz's best-known posters advertised early Universal Classic Monsters films such as Dracula (1931), Frankenstein (1931), The Mummy (1932), The Invisible Man (1933), and Bride of Frankenstein (1935). Beyond the horror genre, his other notable designs include posters for the epic war film All Quiet on the Western Front (1930) and the screwball comedy My Man Godfrey (1936).

Original lithograph copies of his poster art are scarce and highly valued by collectors. Two posters illustrated by Grosz—ads for Frankenstein and The Mummy, respectively—have set the auction record for the world's most expensive film poster. The latter held the record for nearly 20 years and, at the time of its sale in 1997, it may have been the most expensive art print of any kind, including other forms of commercial art as well as fine art. The reference website LearnAboutMoviePosters (LAMP) noted that, as of August 2016, Grosz appeared more than any other artist on its comprehensive list of vintage film posters sold for at least $20,000.

Despite the growth in his artwork's valuation and prominence, very little biographical information about Grosz is known. He was born in Hungary around 1896, immigrated to the United States in 1901, became a naturalized American citizen, lived in New York, and worked in film advertising between approximately 1920 and 1938. Only a small portion of his artistic output has been attributed to him, reflecting the standard anonymity of early American film poster artists.

Life and work

Personal life
Little is known about Grosz's life, as is the case with many early poster artists. Details of his biography have remained obscure even after his illustrations became some of the most valuable in film poster collecting.

In an appendix of the 1988 book Reel Art providing biographical blurbs of poster artists, Grosz's birthplace was given as Hungary but his dates of birth and death were listed as unknown. According to New York state and federal census records dated 1925 and 1930, Grosz was born in Hungary around 1896, immigrated to the United States in 1901, was a naturalized citizen, and spoke Yiddish. He was married to Bertha Grosz around 1917 and they had two children by 1930.

He was sometimes referred to as "Carl" or "Karl" Grosz. He legally changed his name to Carl Grosz Karoly in August 1937.

Early career

Grosz began working in film advertising as early as 1920, when an industry newspaper described him as an employee of producer Lewis J. Selznick's Selznick Pictures, working on art titling at the company's studios in Fort Lee, New Jersey. In 1921, he was listed as a member of the New York-based professional organization Associated Motion Picture Advertisers and an employee of Associated Producers. By 1923, he managed the advertising art departments of both Preferred Pictures and producer Al Lichtman's company.

As a painter, Grosz tended to work with oil and watercolor, and was influenced by a range of movements spanning Expressionism to Art Deco. His posters for the 1923 silent film April Showers were considered novel for the time because the designs emphasized an "idea" or visual theme, rather than literal depictions of scenes that a viewer could expect to see in the film. He was credited the same year with a billboard-size display for silent western The Virginian, the second adaptation of Owen Wister's 1902 novel of the same name.

Career at Universal Pictures
Grosz began working at Universal's art department in New York in the mid-1920s. By 1930, he and Philip Cochrane had been appointed advertising art directors by the company's first advertising manager (and Philip's brother), Robert Cochrane. Grosz and Cochrane have been credited with the generally high artistic quality of Universal's advertising throughout the 1930s. Images like Grosz's teaser poster for Frankenstein introduced the general public to the now-familiar characters from Universal's early horror films. Alongside horror-themed artwork, Grosz's tenure at Universal was distinguished by "lively, dramatic poster work to match the prestige and earnings" of such films as the World War I epic All Quiet on the Western Front(1930) and the early screwball comedy My Man Godfrey(1936).

Grosz's poster designs were exported to international markets, sometimes with modifications or variations. In the United Kingdom, his posters for horror films were deemed so outrageous and lurid that by 1932 the British Board of Film Censors introduced stricter content regulations for advertising displays in public places.

Grosz also made contributions to the look of Universal's films themselves. Most notably, his concept art for Frankenstein's monster, which suggested a more mechanical or robotic appearance, served as the source for the steel bolts in the monster's neck. A comparatively minor detail, the neck-bolts are now an iconic visual element that is closely associated with the monster, especially Universal's version. Although make-up artist Jack Pierce took credit in interviews for the monster's neck-bolts, Argentine-Canadian film critic and historian Alberto Manguel rejected Pierce's claim, finding that Grosz's concept art came earlier.

Cochrane left Universal in 1937, while Grosz may have continued to work there as late as 1938. Following their departures, Universal's poster art of the late 1930s and early 1940s entered a decline marked by a shift from vivid illustrations to mundane photographic reproductions. The quality of Universal's poster art improved again after Maurice Kallis was recruited from Paramount Pictures to serve as art director.

List of attributed film posters and other art

Grosz is believed to have contributed hundreds of illustrations to Universal between the late 1920s and late 1930s. He is often credited, at least partially, for the majority of Universal's posters produced while he was head of the art department—even for posters he may not have necessarily illustrated himself—because his position imputed responsibility for the overall art direction of the distributor's ad campaigns. Determining the authorship of vintage film posters is intrinsically difficult, however, due to the generally anonymous nature of the work, especially in the United States. Grosz's window card for Murders in the Rue Morgue is a rare example of an American film poster from the period signed by the artist.

The list below includes films with poster illustrations, ad campaign art direction, or other artwork that has been specifically attributed to Grosz in a secondary source. The gallery below includes individual designs attributed to him.

Gallery

Retrospective appraisal
Grosz's illustrations are now praised for their artistic quality and prized by collectors, but this was not the case until a half-century after the fact. In their own time, lithograph film posters were ephemeral objects to be distributed to movie theaters and disposed at the end of a film's run. Well-preserved original copies are scarce—for example, there were only two known copies of Grosz's one-sheet poster for The Mummy until 2001, when a third was found in a garage in Arizona.

According to film historians Stephen Rebello and Richard C. Allen, Grosz's colorful, dramatic illustrations "brought... a certain charm and almost naive perfection" to "the highly sensationalistic elements of directors Tod Browning's and James Whale's classics—hideous creatures, half-clad heroines, unsealed tombs, mad doctors." In their estimation, Grosz's work in the horror genre was equaled only by William Rose's poster art for the 1940s B movies produced by Val Lewton for RKO Pictures, such as Cat People(1942). British film historian Sim Branaghan wrote that Grosz's "wild imaginings" had an outsize influence on poster design in the UK from the 1950s onward, especially for the burgeoning market in exploitation films, as film censorship in the United Kingdom diminished and films with mature themes targeting adult audiences became more mainstream.

Tony Nourmand and Graham Marsh wrote that Grosz's posters were highly original and often "as legendary as the films themselves." Although his artistic style usually conformed to the relatively conservative standards of commercial art, they cited his teaser posters for Frankenstein and The Invisible Man as major exceptions that remain "striking," "avant-garde," and "ultra-modern" even by contemporary standards. In 2013, Nourmand included the Frankenstein teaser in a book listing his choices for the 100 "essential" movie posters. The American Film Institute included at least six posters illustrated by Grosz in its 2003 list of "100 Years... 100 American Movie Poster Classics": The Mummy (no.4), The Invisible Man (no.29), the teaser for Frankenstein (no.40), the teaser for The Invisible Man (no.69), Murders in the Rue Morgue (no.85), and Dracula's Daughter (no.88). Premiere magazine ranked The Mummy poster at no.15 in its 2007 list of the 25 best movie posters.

Kirk Hammett—the lead guitarist for Metallica and a prolific collector of horror memorabilia—named Grosz his favorite poster artist:

Hammett likened the Frankenstein teaser poster to an "Andy Warhol portrait gone evil" and, "in essence, an amazing example of pop art, 30 years before that term and movement even existed." Since 1995, he has owned a custom ESP KH-2 electric guitar painted with a design from Grosz's Mummy three-sheet.

Grosz's artwork has been exhibited in art museums. A one-sheet poster for The Mummy was featured in the 1999 exhibition "The American Century: Art and Culture 1900–2000" at the Whitney Museum of American Art. A traveling exhibition of horror memorabilia from Hammett's collection, with several pieces by Grosz, debuted in 2017 at the Peabody Essex Museum in Salem, Massachusetts before continuing to the Royal Ontario Museum in Toronto and the Columbia Museum of Art in Columbia, South Carolina. The high valuation of his work brought him posthumous recognition in his native Hungary as a noteworthy Hungarian artist who lived abroad.

Valuation

The high-end art market generally excluded film memorabilia until the late 1980s. Since that time, original copies of Grosz's poster designs have been highly valued at auction. As of 2012, six of the world's ten most expensive film posters had been produced for Universal horror films under his art direction. He is also the best-represented artist on a much longer list maintained by the website LearnAboutMoviePosters (LAMP), which is periodically updated to include every known sale of a film poster for $20,000 or higher.

Two posters illustrated by Grosz have set the record for most expensive film poster at auction. In an October 1993 auction, a Frankenstein poster sold at auction for $198,000, doubling the pre-sale estimation and nearly tripling the previous record price. In March 1997, Sotheby's sold an original copy of the one-sheet for The Mummy for $453,000. The sale exceeded not only Grosz's own previous record, but also the highest price then achieved for an Art Nouveau poster by French painter Henri de Toulouse-Lautrec; as a result, The Mummy became not only the most-expensive poster in film advertising, but possibly in all of fine art. While Grosz's name had been largely unknown before The Mummy sale, even among high-end collectors, other examples of his poster art dramatically increased in value shortly afterward. Will Bennett of The Daily Telegraph said that "the name that collectors look for is Karoly Grosz", though he noted that the exceptionally high Mummy sale price, equivalent to "a decent painting by Gainsborough", "was regarded as a freak row between two collectors".

The auction record held by The Mummy was broken in 2014 by a poster for the 1927 film London After Midnight. An original Dracula lithograph set the record again in 2017 with a sales price of $525,800; while the illustrator was unidentified, Grosz was responsible for the art direction of the film's poster campaign as a whole. In 2018, another copy of The Mummy poster was expected to reclaim the record with an estimated sales value as high as $1.5million. It failed to sell, however, with no bid meeting the $950,000 minimum by the October 31 deadline.

Notes

Citations

Sources

Bibliography

Periodicals and web sources

1890s births
Year of death unknown
20th-century American painters
20th-century Hungarian painters
20th-century male artists
American illustrators
Film poster artists
Horror artists
Artists from the Bronx
Advertising directors
Jewish American artists
Jewish painters
Hungarian Jews
Austro-Hungarian emigrants to the United States
American people of Hungarian-Jewish descent
Naturalized citizens of the United States
Universal Pictures
Yiddish-speaking people
Hungarian male painters